Marita Skammelsrud Lund (born 29 January 1989) is a Norwegian footballer. She began as a midfielder, but for the Norway women's national football team she plays at right back and at her club, LSK Kvinner FK, she usually plays as central midfield. Lund has previously played for Lisleby FK, Skogstrand and Flyers and Vikings Singapore. She lived in Singapore for four years from 1997 until 2001.

Career
Lund has won 27 caps for Norway women's national football team, while scoring two goals. In October 2007 she was drafted into the senior squad for a match against Russia, aged 18, following an injury to Marit Fiane Christensen. Lund then played for Norway at the 2008 Summer Olympics in China. She also represented Norway in the 2011 FIFA Women's World Cup, where her pace and versatility were praised by the coach, and the 2015 FIFA Women's World Cup.

Marita Skammelsrud Lund is the niece of Bent Skammelsrud, former captain of Rosenborg BK.

References

External links

 
 

1989 births
Living people
Norwegian women's footballers
Norway women's international footballers
Footballers at the 2008 Summer Olympics
Olympic footballers of Norway
2011 FIFA Women's World Cup players
2015 FIFA Women's World Cup players
People from Lørenskog
Norwegian expatriates in Singapore
Toppserien players
LSK Kvinner FK players
Women's association football midfielders
Sportspeople from Viken (county)